Yolande Vannoni ( Logelin) was a female French international table tennis player.

She won a bronze medal at the 1949 World Table Tennis Championships in the Corbillon Cup (women's team event) with Huguette Béolet and Jeanne Delay for France.

She also won six French national titles from 1943 to 1953 which included four singles titles.

See also
 List of table tennis players
 List of World Table Tennis Championships medalists

References

French female table tennis players
2016 deaths
World Table Tennis Championships medalists